Institution Saint-Louis de Gonzague is a primary and secondary Roman Catholic le lekol in Port-au-Prince, Haiti. It was founded and is run by the Brothers of Christian Instruction  (FIC) (Frères de l'instruction chrétienne de Ploërmel). The school colors are red and green

History

Considered among the most prestigious schools in Haiti, it was founded in 1890 and initially located at rue du Centre, in downtown Port-au-Prince for children 6 to 12. By 1930, Saint-Louis de Gonzague offered degrees for secondary school. In the early 1970s, Saint-Louis de Gonzague engaged in a major expansion. The director at that time, Brother Ephrem Le-Mat, built a new campus on previously acquired land in the suburb of Delmas. Since then, the secondary school has moved to that new campus.

The primary school has an enrollment of about 400 students. Each of the six grades has three sections. After the 2010 Haiti earthquake, the primary school moved to the Delmas campus, as the secondary school still is.

The secondary school is composed of seven grades with about 1000 students divided into two sections, Third Cycle (Troisième Cycle) and Secondary School (Secondaire). Students are arranged in different sections per grade: blue, yellow, purple, red, or green. The seventh and the eight grades currently have 5 classes of all colors. The ninth and tenth (neuvieme, troisieme) grades have 4 classes (purple is dropped). The eleventh, twelfth and thirteenth (Seconde, Rhéto, Philo) generally have three classes (yellow is dropped). Students are required to choose a section (B,C or D) when they reach the eleventh grade. These sections are used for national exams, Haitian Baccalauréat. The group is usually shrunk from 250 students in seventh grade to 100 in the final grade.

In 1998, the FIC decided to share the directing roles with non-religious members of the school. S. Roger Legagneur and Mona B. Anthony have held managerial roles in the secondary school until 2009. The institution then returned to a religious-only management. Brother Charles Coutard is the principal of the secondary school, and Brother Ewald Guerrier is the principal for the primary school. The school is known for its tough grading.

2010 earthquake

On 12 January, Port-au-Prince was hit by an earthquake. Saint-Louis Gonzague buildings suffered severe damages. The location in the city center of Port-au-Prince was completely destroyed. The Third Cycle building was severely damaged, and deemed not suited for reconstruction. The Secondary school building had minor damages comparatively but was not suitable for hosting students. The school was the site of shelter of more than 10,000 persons for more than 6 months.

From 2010 to 2012, students from all classes attended school under tents at the Delmas 31 campus. In the Fall of 2012, the Secondary classes returned in their old location. In March 2014, Third cycle classes returned inside constructed buildings. Primary school classes returned inside concrete buildings located in the Delmas campus in April 2014.

Past head principals
2020- : Fr. Milot Frédérique
2017-  2020  : Fr. Valmyr Dabel
2013–2017: Fr. Charles Coutard
2010–2013: Fr. Dufreine Auguste
2004–2010: Fr. Joseph Bellanger
1998–2004: Fr. Charles Coutard
1992–1998: Fr. Joseph Bellanger
1986–1992: Fr. Serge Larose

Notable alumni

 André Apaid, businessman, Leader of the civil society movement Group of 184
 Kervin Bristol, professional basketball player in Europe
 Eliezer Cadet, Garveyite observer at the Paris Peace Conference
 Jean-Claude Duvalier, son of François Duvalier, President of Haiti from 1971 to 1986
Gary Klang, Haitian-Canadian poet and novelist
 Laurent Lamothe, CEO of Global Voice Group and former prime minister
 Ludovic Lamothe, Haitian composer and virtuoso pianist, considered one of Haiti's most important classical composers
 Leslie Manigat, former President of Haiti
 Michel Joseph Martelly, former President of Haiti
 Olivier Noel, cofounder of DNASimple
 Charlemagne Péralte, Haitian nationalist leader who opposed the US invasion of Haiti
 Jacques Roumain, writer, politician, and founder of the Haitian Communist Party
 Daniel Rouzier, businessman and author
 Fabrice Rouzier, musician and CEO of SUN Auto
 Maurice Sixto, Haitian humorist and raconteur

References

External links
 Official website

Schools in Haiti
Catholic schools in Haiti
Educational institutions established in 1890
1890 establishments in Haiti